Maidstone Corporation Tramways operated a tramway service in Maidstone in England between 1904 and 1930.

History

Maidstone Corporation began operation on 14 July 1904 with the introduction of a tram service to Barming, supplemented by routes to Loose and Tovil by 1907.

Closure

The tramway service closed on 11 February 1930 as part of a programme of conversion to trolleybus operation. Tramcar 18 survives and is in storage in Dover awaiting restoration.

References

Tram transport in England
3 ft 6 in gauge railways in England